The Festival International de Jazz de Montréal is an annual jazz festival held in Montreal, Quebec, Canada. The Montreal Jazz Fest holds the 2004 Guinness World Record as the world's largest jazz festival. Every year it features roughly 3,000 artists from 30-odd countries, more than 650 concerts (including 450 free outdoor performances), and welcomes over 2 million visitors (12.5% of whom are tourists) as well as 300 accredited journalists. The festival takes place at 20 different stages, which include free outdoor stages and indoor concert halls.

A major part of the city's downtown core is closed to traffic for ten days, as free outdoor shows are open to the public and held on many stages at the same time, from noon until midnight. The "festival's Big Event concerts typically draw between 100,000 and 150,000 people", and can occasionally exceed 200,000. Shows are held in a wide variety of venues, from relatively small jazz clubs to the large concert halls of Place des Arts. Some of the outdoor shows are held on the cordoned-off streets, while others are in terraced parks.

History 
Rouè-Doudou Boicel founded the Rising Sun Festijazz, Montreal's first blues & jazz festival in 1978. There were also other previous jazz festivals in Montreal, including the 3-day Jazz de Chez Nous festival in 1979, created by Montreal bassist Charlie Biddle.

The Montreal Jazz Festival (later: Montreal International Jazz Festival) was conceived by Alain Simard, who had spent much of the 1970s working with Productions Kosmos bringing artists such as Chuck Berry, Dave Brubeck, Chick Corea, Bo Diddley, John Lee Hooker, Muddy Waters, and others to Montreal to perform.  In 1977, Simard teamed up with André Ménard and Denys McCann to form an agency named Spectra Scène (now known as L'Équipe Spectra), with the idea of creating a summer festival in Montreal that would bring a number of artists together at the same time.

They planned their first festival for the summer of 1979. Unable to secure sufficient funding, their plans were scuttled, but they still were able to produce two nights of shows at Théâtre-St-Denis featuring Keith Jarrett and Pat Metheny.

Starting on May 10, 1980, a Montreal Jazz Festival was staged, with funding from Alain de Grosbois of CBC Stereo and Radio-Québec.  With Gary Burton, Ray Charles, Chick Corea, and Vic Vogel on the bill, and an attendance of 12,000, the event was deemed a success and has continued to grow since then.

In 2000, the Festival teamed up with Distribution Select to release its 4-CD box set called Over 20 years of music – Plus de 20 ans de musique. The box includes a 13-page booklet with the artists' biographies and complete liner notes about the music.

In 1999, a group of Montreal jazz musicians disenchanted with the Montreal International Jazz Festival's lack of support for and showcasing of Montreal jazz musicians created an alternative festival called L'OFF Festival de Jazz de Montreal. The alternative festival continues as an annual, week-long jazz festival in Montreal, programmed largely by musicians.

In 2020, for the first time in its 40-year history the International Montreal Jazz Festival was cancelled, due to the COVID-19 pandemic, in what would have been its 41st edition.

In 2021, because of the on-going COVID-19 pandemic, it was announced that the 41st edition would be postponed until the autumn, and would be reduced to 5 days, with limited outdoor performances, whilst indoor shows would be put on hold until 2022. The possibility of outright cancellation remained.

Recordings 

A number of albums have been recorded live at the festival, including:

Live at Montreal International Jazz Festival – New Air (1983)
Live at the Montreal Jazz Festival 1985 – Ahmad Jamal (1985)
After the Morning – John Hicks (1992)
Live at the Montreal Jazz Festival – Diana Krall (2004)
Live from the Montreal International Jazz Festival – Ben Harper & Relentless7 (2010)

Charlie Haden, The Montreal Tapes – recorded in 1989
 The Montreal Tapes: with Don Cherry and Ed Blackwell (Verve, 1994)
 The Montreal Tapes: with Paul Bley and Paul Motian (Verve, 1994)
 The Montreal Tapes: with Geri Allen and Paul Motian (Verve, 1997)
 The Montreal Tapes: with Gonzalo Rubalcaba and Paul Motian (Verve, 1997)
 The Montreal Tapes: Liberation Music Orchestra (Verve, 1997)
 The Montreal Tapes: Tribute to Joe Henderson (Verve, 2003)

Concours de Jazz

Established in 1982, the Concours de Jazz is an annual competition held at the Montreal International Jazz Festival. The competition takes place between Canadian groups performing original music, and is part of the festival's outdoor program. Throughout its history the prize has been awarded to many of Canada's most prominent jazz musicians.

Name changes
1982-1986 – Concours de Jazz
1987-1992 – Prix de Jazz Alcan
1993-1999 – Prix de Jazz du Maurier
2000-2009 – Grand Prix de Jazz General Motors
2012–present – TD Grand Jazz Award, sponsored by Toronto-Dominion Bank (TD Bank)

Winners
1982 – Michel Donato
1983 – Quartz
1984 – Lorraine Desmarais Trio
1985 – François Bourassa
1986 – Jon Ballantyne Trio
1987 – Hugh Fraser Quintet
1988 – Edmonton Jazz Ensemble
1989 – Fifth Avenue
1990 – Creatures of Habit
1991 – Steve Amirault Trio
1992 – James Gelfand Trio
1993 – Chelsea Bridge
1994 – Normand Guilbeault Ensemble
1995 – Jean-François Groulx Trio
1996 – Roy Patterson Quartet
1997 – Joel Miller Quintet
1998 – John Stetch Trio
1999 – Chris Mitchell Quintet
2000 – Eduardo Pipman Quartet
2001 – Nick Ali and Cruzao
2002 – Andrew Downing and The Great Uncles of the Revolution
2003 – Nancy Walker
2004 – Odd Jazz Group
2005 – Alex Bellegarde Quartette
2006 – David Virelles Quintet
2007 – Félix Stüssi and Give Me Five
2008 – Arden Arapyan
2009 – Amanda Tosoff Quartet
2010 – Parc X Trio
2011 – Alexandre Côté Quintet
2012 – Robi Botos
2013 – Hutchinson-Andrew Trio
2014 – Pram Trio
2015 – Rachel Therrien Quintet
2016 – Brad Cheeseman Group
2017 – Allison Au Quartet

References

External links 

Music competitions in Canada
Music festivals in Montreal
Jazz festivals in Canada
Summer festivals
Music festivals established in 1980
Quartier des spectacles
Summer events in Canada